Abies cilicica, also known as Cilician fir or Taurus fir, is a species of conifer in the family Pinaceae. It is found in Lebanon, Syria, and Turkey. Abies cilicica and Cedrus libani, together with Acer hyrcanum subsp. tauricolum and Sorbus torminalis subsp. orientalis, are the predominant trees in the phytocoenosis Abeti-Cedrion, a type of forest of the middle and eastern Taurus Mountains of Turkey. These forests occur between 800 and 2,100 meters elevation. Over 5,000 years of logging, burning, and grazing have reduced these forests to enclaves.

In 2009 at Berenice Troglodytica, the Egypto-Roman port on the Red Sea, archaeologists found: "two blocks of resin from the Syrian fir tree (Abies cilicica), one weighing about 190 g and the other about 339 g, recovered from 1st-century AD contexts in one of the harbour trenches. Produced in areas of greater Syria and Asia Minor, this resin and its oil derivative were used in mummification, as an antiseptic, a diuretic, to treat wrinkles, extract worms and promote hair growth."

The Cilician fir is a significant source of timber in Turkey, where it is relatively common; it is primarily used for plywood for construction. It is not commonly cultivated, however, because of its susceptibility to late frost in early spring.

Gallery

Footnotes

External links
 Conifers Around the World: Abies cilicica - Cilician Fir.
 Abies cilicica. Distribution map, genetic conservation units and related resources. European Forest Genetic Resources Programme (EUFORGEN)

cilicica
Least concern plants
Flora of Western Asia
Trees of Turkey
Taxonomy articles created by Polbot
Plants described in 1853
Natural history of Anatolia